Tai Lin Radio Service Limited was one of Hong Kong's largest electrical appliance retail chains. Founded in 1946, it liquidated on 17 October 2008, having thirteen branches altogether throughout the territory at the time.

History
Tai Lin opened its first store at 309 Nathan Road, Yau Ma Tei, primarily selling radio sets. Since then, it rapidly developed its servicing, management and retail services, besides including tape recorders, gramophones and amplifiers into its line-up. In 1957, Tai Lin became the first electrical appliance store to introduce stereo Hi-Fi to the Hong Kong market.

In the population boom of the 1960s, Tai Lin expanded its product line to television sets, refrigerators, washing machines, air conditioners and cameras, among others, and at the same time, opening new branches to form a retail chain. In 1976, Tai Lin registered itself as a company under the name "Tai Lin Radio Services Limited."

The 1980s and 1990s were defined as Tai Lin's "golden age." The chain has spent HK$50 million in 1989 to refurbish its existing branches. In addition to three stores in Mong Kok and To Kwa Wan, Tai Lin made its proactive expansion throughout the Hong Kong market with new stores in Kwun Tong, Sha Tin, Causeway Bay et cetera. At its peak in 1997, Tai Lin had 13 stores altogether.

After 62 years in existence, Tai Lin collapsed and succumbed, reportedly to the effects of the global financial crisis, affecting 260 personnel from thirteen branches.

Stores
The following are all of Tai Lin's stores at the time of its closure:
Hong Kong Island
Times Square
905B-906, 9th Floor
815-816, 8th Floor
Shop 2015-2016, Podium Level 2, IFC Mall

Kowloon
309 -310, Level 3, Ocean Centre, Harbour City, Tsim Sha Tsui
G52, Ground Floor, Telford Plaza I, Kowloon Bay
Basement, Sim City, Mong Kok
310 - 312, Nathan Road, Jordan
32B, Mut Wah Street, Kwun Tong

New Territories
623-626, Level 6, New Town Plaza, Phase 1, Sha Tin
G33-34, Ground Floor, The Edge, 9 Tong Chun Street, Tseung Kwan O
G04 Ground Floor, The Edge, 9 Tong Chun Street, Tseung Kwan O
G - 1/F, Chow's Building, 4 Shiu Wo Street, Tsuen Wan
G30-G33 & G35, Ground Floor, Tuen Mun Town Plaza, Phase 1, 1 Tuen Shing St, Tuen Mun

References

External links

Tai Lin Radio Service Limited homepage (archived copies)

Retail companies established in 1946
Retail companies disestablished in 2008
Defunct companies of Hong Kong
Defunct retail companies of China
Privately held companies of China
1946 establishments in Hong Kong
2008 disestablishments in Hong Kong